The Hillyard Cabin is a historic log cabin on Old Burr Road, northeast of Warm Springs, Arkansas.  It is a single-pen log structure, with a gable roof and a fieldstone chimney.  The pen is  square, fashioned out of sawn logs laid without chinking.  The east-facing front facade has a shed-roof porch extending across its width, with a doorway into the cabin on the right and a window on the left.  The cabin was built in 1932-33 by a local resident for his brother, an Illinois resident, to use as a vacation site.  The cabin is architecturally significant for its distinctive sawn-log construction style, in 1994, at which time it was undergoing restoration and rehabilitation.

See also
National Register of Historic Places listings in Randolph County, Arkansas

References

Houses on the National Register of Historic Places in Arkansas
Houses completed in 1933
Houses in Randolph County, Arkansas
Log cabins in the United States
National Register of Historic Places in Randolph County, Arkansas
Log buildings and structures on the National Register of Historic Places in Arkansas